Angela Christian is an American actress and singer.

Career
Christian trained at the Boston Conservatory. In 2000, she made her Broadway debut as Lily in Richard Nelson's James Joyce's The Dead. In 2004, she made her West End debut creating the title role in Andrew Lloyd Webber's The Woman in White, directed by Trevor Nunn, which she then reprised on Broadway. Also on Broadway she created the role of Miss Dorothy Brown in Thoroughly Modern Millie, for which she was nominated for an Outer Critics Circle Award.

On television, Christian has appeared in episodes of Law & Order, House of Cards, and Unforgettable.

In 2017, Christian was set to co-produce the film Silver Wings with author Katherine Sharp Landdeck. The film was to be directed by her then partner Thomas Kail.

In 2019, Christian played a First Order officer in Star Wars: The Rise of Skywalker.

Personal life
Christian was born in Alabama and raised in San Antonio, Texas. She began a relationship with director Thomas Kail in 2006; they divorced in 2019.

Theatre

Awards and nominations

References

External links

American women singers
American stage actresses
Living people
Musicians from Birmingham, Alabama
Boston Conservatory at Berklee alumni
Actresses from Birmingham, Alabama
Year of birth missing (living people)
21st-century American women